O. roseus may refer to:
 Odontamblyopus roseus, an eel goby species found in muddy-bottomed coastal waters along the west coast of India
 Opisthopatus roseus, the pink velvet worm, a species in the Phylum Onychophora
 Osedax roseus, a polychaete worm which feeds upon the bones found in the carcasses of whales

See also
 Roseus (disambiguation)